Center Township is one of fourteen townships in Clinton County, Indiana. As of the 2010 census, its population was 17,245 and it contained 6,878 housing units. It contains the city of Frankfort, the county seat.

History
Center Township was created in 1872 from the northern part of Jackson Township; the northern part of Center was later split off to create Union Township in 1889.  The first white settler in the township was George Michaels in 1827, followed the next year by John Douglass, Matthew Bunnell and Noah Bunnell.  More arrived in 1829, including the three Pence brothers who donated the land upon which the city of Frankfort was built.

As the geographic and business center of the county, numerous railroad where laid through the township and included the Monon, the Vandalia, the Toledo, St. Louis and Western, the Terre Haute, Indianapolis and Eastern, and the Kokomo.

Geography

Cities and towns
 Frankfort

Unincorporated towns
 East Park
 Kentwood
 Risse
 Wesley Manor
 Wilshire
 Woodside Park
(This list is based on USGS data and may include former settlements.)

Adjacent townships
 Union Township (north)
 Michigan Township (east)
 Kirklin Township (southeast)
 Jackson Township (south)
 Washington Township (west)

Major highways
  U.S. Route 421
  Indiana State Road 28
  Indiana State Road 38
  Indiana State Road 75

Cemeteries
The township contains two cemeteries: Greenlawn Memorial Park and Old South.

References
 
 United States Census Bureau cartographic boundary files

Townships in Clinton County, Indiana
1872 establishments in Indiana
Townships in Indiana
Populated places established in 1872